Ludwig Wörl (1906 – 27 August 1967), was a carpenter by profession. He was an opponent of Nazism, and as a result of his actions, was imprisoned in the Nazi concentration camps. He received the title of Righteous Among the Nations file #1 (the first to be recognized) for rescuing Jews in concentration camps.

Activity during WWII 
One of Wörl's anti-Nazi activities was to publish information booklets to the general public in Munich about the terrible conditions in the Nazi concentration camps. This action caused his imprisonment in Dachau 1934, by the Gestapo. After nine months in a dark detention cell, he was first transferred to the camp's carpentry shop and eventually became a paramedic in the medical clinic. In 1942, there was an outbreak of the Typhus in Auschwitz, that resulted in the deaths of tens of thousands of Auschwitz prisoners and personnel. In order to deal with the disease, Wörl was sent together with 17 other male nurses to the camp's clinic.

Appointed as the Lagerälteste (the camp elder) of the hospital barracks, Wörl  employed Jewish doctors, against the express orders of the SS, and saved them from certain death. Wörl, who cared for the health of his patients in the camp, put his life at constant risk in order to obtain the minimum medical equipment for the treatment of the prisoners. He would falsify patient data lists, in order to save them from the gas chambers. As a result of consistent opposition to the orders of SS doctors aimed at deciding the number of patients, Wörl was arrested and re-imprisoned in an isolated detention cell.

After his release, by virtue of his German descent and seniority, and thanks to his medical experience, he was appointed head of a forced-labour camp, called Güntergrube, which was located near Auschwitz. In his new role, he protected 600 Jewish prisoners who had been abused by the German kapos. He made sure that they would get the clothes and food they needed despite the unequal distribution that took place in the camp. Wörl acted openly for the Jews and their rights and looked for the best way to gain their trust.

He worked tirelessly for the Jews, created among them the idea of underground action and mass flight, raised the Jewish morale, and gave many prisoners hope that the end of this difficult time was near.

After the war 
After the war, Wörl was in charge of the Auschwitz Prisoners' Organization in Germany. He remained a clear anti-Nazi even after the war, and searched for the SS soldiers from the camps. In addition, Wörl devoted his life to commemorating Nazi crimes and prosecuting the perpetrators. In 1963 he was one of the main witnesses at the Auschwitz trial in Frankfurt.

Until his death on 27 August 1967, he appeared in public assemblies and showed documents he had collected about the concentration camps in plays and films. On 19 March 1963, Yad Vashem recognized Ludwig Wörl as a Righteous Among the Nations.

References 

1906 births
1967 deaths
German Righteous Among the Nations
German carpenters
Place of birth missing